Anarchism or Socialism? is a 1906/1907 work by Soviet leader Joseph Stalin. The work sought to analyze anarchism using Marxist methods.

Background 
The composition of this work was developed in the years following the failed 1905 Russian Revolution; Stalin at this period of time adopted a strong Marxist ideology. The philosophy of anarchism played a significant role in Russian history, with numerous notable Russian anarchists, such as Mikhail Bakunin, Emma Goldman, Peter Kropotkin, and Leo Tolstoy. At the time anarchists in Georgia were engaged in an ideological campaign against Marxists in the Caucasus, and Stalin was made responsible for Bolshevik operations in the Caucasus region.

History of publication 
The articles that became Anarchism or Socialism began as a series of newspaper articles written in Georgian. The first four articles were published in their original form in the daily Bolshevik newspaper  ("New Life") published in Tbilisi, under the direction of Stalin, in June–July 1906.

Synopsis 
The work focuses on Stalin's criticism of the philosophy of anarchism and responses to anarchist criticisms of Marxists. According to Stalin anarchists had no support among the working class, but they had some success outside the workers and among petite bourgeoisie groups.

See also 
 List of books about anarchism
 Anarcho-communism
 Marxism–Leninism
 Vladimir Lenin bibliography

References 

Books about Stalinism
Works by Joseph Stalin
Books about anarchism
Anarchism in Russia
Marxist theory
Anti-anarchism
1906 non-fiction books
1907 non-fiction books
Russian non-fiction books